TiffinCAD is an affordable lightweight Computer-aided design software that can be run on basic Atom-powered netbooks. It can produce technical drawings using the IntelliCAD engine commonly used by other CAD developers, which includes DWG file format capability, with some local additions, and is bundled with other CAD-based vertical software. It was developed by Kuala Lumpur, Malaysia based Innovacia Sdn Bhd.

References

Citations

Bibliography

Computer-aided design software
Computer-aided design